A motion picture film scanner is a device used in digital filmmaking to scan original film for storage as high-resolution digital intermediate files.

A film scanner scans original film stock: negative or positive print or reversal/IP. Units may scan gauges from 8 mm to 70 mm (8 mm, Super 8, 9.5 mm, 16 mm, Super 16, 35 mm, Super 35, 65 mm and 70 mm) with very high resolution scanning at 2K, 4K, 8K, or 16K resolutions. (2K is approximately 2048×1080 pixels and 4K is approximately 4096×2160 pixels).

Some models of film scanner are intermittent pull-down film scanners which scan each frame individually, locked down in a pin-registered film gate, taking roughly a second per frame. Continuous-scan film scanners, where the film frames are scanned as the film is continuously moved past the imaging pick up device, are typically evolved from earlier telecine mechanisms, and can act as such at lower resolutions.

The scanner scans the film frames into a file sequence (using high-end computer data storage devices), whose single file contains a digital scan of each still frame; the preferred image file format used as output are usually Cineon, DPX or TIFF, because they can store color information as raw data, preserving the optical characteristics of the film stock. These systems take a lot of storage area network (SAN) disk space. The files can be played back one after each other on high-end workstation non-linear editing system (NLE) or a virtual telecine systems. The playback is at the normal rate of 24 frames per second (or original projection frame rate of: 25, 30 or other speeds). Each year hard disks get larger and are able to hold more hours of movies on SAN systems. The challenge is to archive this massive amount of data on to data storage devices.
The scanned footage is edited and composited on work stations then mastered back on film, see film-out and digital intermediate. Scanned film frames may also be used in digital film restoration. The film may also be projected directly on a digital projector in the theater. The data film files may be converted to SDTV (NTSC or PAL) video TV systems. Film recorders are the opposite of film scanners, copying content from a computer system onto film stock, for preservation or for display using film projectors. Telecines are similar to film scanners.

Imaging device 

 The front end of a motion picture film scanner is similar to a telecine. The imaging system may be either a charge-coupled device (CCD), a complementary metal–oxide–semiconductor (CMOS) or photomultipliers imaging pick up.
 A lamp is used as the light source in a CCD imaging front end. The CCDs convert the light to the video signals.
 In a cathode ray tube (CRT) imaging system the CRT (also called a Flying spot tube) is used as the light source and part of the scanning system. Photomultipliers or avalanche photodiodes are used to convert the light to electrical video signals.
 A prism and/or dichroic mirrors or color filters are used to separate the light into the three: red, green and blue, imaging pick up devices.

Image processing 
 The three color signals (RGB) are electronically processed and color graded. A 3D look up table (3D LUT) is usually applied to the RGB values before it is coded into the DPX output files. 
 The DPX files are usually made output through a network port cable or an optical fiber port: HIPPI, Fibre Channel or newer systems like gigabit Ethernet. A computer then stores the files on to hard drives of a storage area network for later processing and use.  
Modern motion picture film scanners many have an option for an infrared CCD channel for dirt mapping, that can be used to automatically or in post manually remove dirt-dust spots on the film. The IR camera channel can be used with IR dirt and scratch removal system or made output on a four IR channel for downstream dirt and dirt and scratch removal systems. Popular downstream dirt and dirt and scratch removal systems are PF Clean and Digital ICE.
 HDR or high dynamic range is a new system, using a compositing and tone-mapping of images to extend the dynamic range beyond the native capability of the capturing device. This may be done by using a triple exposure for the film and then compositing the three back together. Compositing can be done in a workstation in none real time or in the scanner in real time.

Models 
 Single frame intermittent pull-down:
 Kodak's Cineon, the first system designed for DI work, included a scanner, tapes drives, workstations and a film recorder.
 Lasergraphics - The Director 2K/4K, 19 frames per second
 ARRI scanner, Arriscan
 Filmlight - Northlight Film scanning, single frame intermittent scanner
Imagica scanner, single frame intermittent scanner.
Cintel's diTTo
 Continuous motion scanning:
 Walde - FilmStar 4K UHD   2K @ 25fps, 4K UHD @ 6fps.  35mm/16mm/8mm archive quality,  continuous motion capstan driven.
MWA Nova  Vario series with patented laser-based, sprocket and claw free transport for 16/35mm for realtime (24/25fps) scanning with sensors for either 2K+ 2236 x 1752, or 2.5K+ HDR High Dynamic Range at 2560 x 2160, direct optical and magnetic sound on and 16 and 35mm.
MWA Nova Choice 2K+ patented laser-based, sprocket and claw free transport for 8/Super8, 9.5mm, 16mm realtime (24/25fps)  scanning w at 2K+, 2236 x 1752 with direct optical and magnetic sound on 16mm, magnetic from main and balance stripes on 8, Super8. Faster than real time scanning at lower resolution.
 Lasergraphics - ScanStation 2K, 60+ frames per second
 GE4 - Golden Eye Four - Filmscanner, 38 Mega Pixel camera. LED light source and continuous film transport using Capstan. From Digital Vision.
 P+S Technik - SteadyFrame Universal Format Film Scanner
 Cintel's C-Reality/DSX and ITK - Millennium/dataMill.
 Spirit DataCine - SDC2000 with data option, DFT Digital Film Technology (1920 pixels in realtime at 4 frame/s) (can be switched to telecine mode) 
 Spirit DataCine 4K/2K with the data option, DFT Digital Film Technology (2K realtime at 24 frame/s or 4K scans at 6 frame/s) (can be switched to telecine mode, only if it has this option)
  Scanity by DFT, uses continuous transport using capstan and an LED light source. Transfer speeds: 15 frame/s @ 4K, 25 frame/s @ 2K.Scanity HDR and Scanity wet-gate.

See also 
 Color suite
 Film scanner
 Image scanner
 Film-out
 Film recorder
 Post-production
 Direct to Disk Recording
 Television
 Hard disk recorder

Photo gallery

References

Image scanners
Special effects
Film and video technology
Digital media